William Malley may refer to:

 Bill Malley, American production designer and art director
 William C. Malley (c. 1868–1908), American football player and coach